The 2001–02 New Jersey Devils season was the 28th season for the National Hockey League franchise that was established on June 11, 1974, and 20th season since the franchise relocated from Colorado prior to the 1982–83 NHL season. The Devils finished sixth in the Eastern Conference and were eliminated in the first round of the playoffs. Fifty-one games in to the season, head coach Larry Robinson was fired and Kevin Constantine was named his replacement for their final 31 games. On April 13, 2002, the Devils clinched a sixth-place Conference finish and a third-place Division finish. The Devils came into the playoffs for the 6th consecutive season but they were upset in the Conference Quarterfinals by the eventual Eastern Conference champions, the Carolina Hurricanes, losing in six games.

Regular season
The Devils had the fewest power-play opportunities during the regular season, with just 261, and they tied the Washington Capitals for the fewest short-handed goals scored, with just two. However, the Devils were also the most disciplined team during the regular season, finishing with an NHL-low 265 power-play opportunities against.

Season standings

Playoffs

Eastern Conference Quarterfinals

(E6) New Jersey Devils vs. (E3) Carolina Hurricanes 
The series opened in Raleigh. Carolina won Games 1 and 2, 2–1 – Game 1 in regulation and Game 2 in overtime. Games 3 and 4 were at the Meadowlands. The Devils won Game 3, 4–0, and Game 4, 3–1. Game 5 was back in Raleigh, where the Hurricanes won 3–2 in overtime. Game 6 shifted back to the Meadowlands, where Carolina prevailed 1–0 and clinched the series victory, 4–2.

Schedule and results

Regular season

|- align="center" bgcolor="#FFBBBB"
|1||L||October 6, 2001||1–6 || align="left"| @ Washington Capitals (2001–02) ||0–1–0–0 || 
|- align="center" bgcolor="#FFBBBB"
|2||L||October 11, 2001||4–6 || align="left"| New York Islanders (2001–02) ||0–2–0–0 || 
|- align="center" bgcolor="#FFBBBB"
|3||L||October 13, 2001||1–3 || align="left"| @ Montreal Canadiens (2001–02) ||0–3–0–0 || 
|- align="center" bgcolor="#FF6F6F"
|4||OTL||October 17, 2001||3–4 OT|| align="left"| @ New York Rangers (2001–02) ||0–3–0–1 || 
|- align="center" bgcolor="#CCFFCC" 
|5||W||October 18, 2001||6–1 || align="left"| San Jose Sharks (2001–02) ||1–3–0–1 || 
|- align="center" bgcolor="#CCFFCC" 
|6||W||October 20, 2001||3–2 || align="left"| Ottawa Senators (2001–02) ||2–3–0–1 || 
|- align="center" bgcolor="#CCFFCC" 
|7||W||October 23, 2001||2–1 || align="left"| @ Ottawa Senators (2001–02) ||3–3–0–1 || 
|- align="center" bgcolor="#CCFFCC" 
|8||W||October 27, 2001||3–1 || align="left"| Buffalo Sabres (2001–02) ||4–3–0–1 || 
|- align="center" bgcolor="#CCFFCC" 
|9||W||October 30, 2001||4–3 OT|| align="left"| @ Boston Bruins (2001–02) ||5–3–0–1 || 
|-

|- align="center" bgcolor="#CCFFCC" 
|10||W||November 1, 2001||5–2 || align="left"| Phoenix Coyotes (2001–02) ||6–3–0–1 || 
|- align="center" bgcolor="#FFBBBB"
|11||L||November 3, 2001||1–2 || align="left"| Boston Bruins (2001–02) ||6–4–0–1 || 
|- align="center" bgcolor="#CCFFCC" 
|12||W||November 7, 2001||3–2 || align="left"| Atlanta Thrashers (2001–02) ||7–4–0–1 || 
|- align="center" bgcolor="#CCFFCC" 
|13||W||November 9, 2001||3–2 OT|| align="left"| Toronto Maple Leafs (2001–02) ||8–4–0–1 || 
|- align="center" 
|14||T||November 10, 2001||1–1 OT|| align="left"| @ Toronto Maple Leafs (2001–02) ||8–4–1–1 || 
|- align="center" bgcolor="#FFBBBB"
|15||L||November 13, 2001||1–5 || align="left"| Pittsburgh Penguins (2001–02) ||8–5–1–1 || 
|- align="center" bgcolor="#FF6F6F"
|16||OTL||November 15, 2001||4–5 OT|| align="left"| @ Boston Bruins (2001–02) ||8–5–1–2 || 
|- align="center" bgcolor="#FFBBBB"
|17||L||November 17, 2001||1–3 || align="left"| Philadelphia Flyers (2001–02) ||8–6–1–2 || 
|- align="center" bgcolor="#FFBBBB"
|18||L||November 18, 2001||0–2 || align="left"| Colorado Avalanche (2001–02) ||8–7–1–2 || 
|- align="center" 
|19||T||November 20, 2001||3–3 OT|| align="left"| @ Philadelphia Flyers (2001–02) ||8–7–2–2 || 
|- align="center" bgcolor="#FFBBBB"
|20||L||November 23, 2001||0–2 || align="left"| @ Tampa Bay Lightning (2001–02) ||8–8–2–2 || 
|- align="center" bgcolor="#CCFFCC" 
|21||W||November 24, 2001||5–1 || align="left"| @ Florida Panthers (2001–02) ||9–8–2–2 || 
|- align="center" bgcolor="#FFBBBB"
|22||L||November 27, 2001||0–6 || align="left"| @ Pittsburgh Penguins (2001–02) ||9–9–2–2 || 
|- align="center" bgcolor="#FFBBBB"
|23||L||November 30, 2001||2–4 || align="left"| @ Detroit Red Wings (2001–02) ||9–10–2–2 || 
|-

|- align="center" bgcolor="#CCFFCC" 
|24||W||December 1, 2001||4–1 || align="left"| Detroit Red Wings (2001–02) ||10–10–2–2 || 
|- align="center" 
|25||T||December 4, 2001||1–1 OT|| align="left"| Tampa Bay Lightning (2001–02) ||10–10–3–2 || 
|- align="center" bgcolor="#CCFFCC" 
|26||W||December 5, 2001||2–1 || align="left"| @ Montreal Canadiens (2001–02) ||11–10–3–2 || 
|- align="center" bgcolor="#CCFFCC" 
|27||W||December 8, 2001||3–1 || align="left"| Washington Capitals (2001–02) ||12–10–3–2 || 
|- align="center" bgcolor="#FFBBBB"
|28||L||December 10, 2001||1–3 || align="left"| @ Columbus Blue Jackets (2001–02) ||12–11–3–2 || 
|- align="center" bgcolor="#CCFFCC" 
|29||W||December 12, 2001||3–2 OT|| align="left"| New York Islanders (2001–02) ||13–11–3–2 || 
|- align="center" bgcolor="#FFBBBB"
|30||L||December 14, 2001||2–3 || align="left"| Florida Panthers (2001–02) ||13–12–3–2 || 
|- align="center" bgcolor="#CCFFCC" 
|31||W||December 15, 2001||2–0 || align="left"| @ Ottawa Senators (2001–02) ||14–12–3–2 || 
|- align="center" 
|32||T||December 19, 2001||2–2 OT|| align="left"| @ New York Rangers (2001–02) ||14–12–4–2 || 
|- align="center" 
|33||T||December 20, 2001||3–3 OT|| align="left"| Edmonton Oilers (2001–02) ||14–12–5–2 || 
|- align="center" bgcolor="#FFBBBB"
|34||L||December 22, 2001||0–1 || align="left"| Ottawa Senators (2001–02) ||14–13–5–2 || 
|- align="center" bgcolor="#CCFFCC" 
|35||W||December 26, 2001||4–0 || align="left"| Pittsburgh Penguins (2001–02) ||15–13–5–2 || 
|- align="center" bgcolor="#FFBBBB"
|36||L||December 29, 2001||2–4 || align="left"| @ Vancouver Canucks (2001–02) ||15–14–5–2 || 
|- align="center" bgcolor="#CCFFCC" 
|37||W||December 30, 2001||2–1 || align="left"| @ Edmonton Oilers (2001–02) ||16–14–5–2 || 
|-

|- align="center" bgcolor="#CCFFCC" 
|38||W||January 1, 2002||2–1 || align="left"| St. Louis Blues (2001–02) ||17–14–5–2 || 
|- align="center" bgcolor="#FFBBBB"
|39||L||January 3, 2002||3–4 || align="left"| Nashville Predators (2001–02) ||17–15–5–2 || 
|- align="center" bgcolor="#CCFFCC" 
|40||W||January 5, 2002||2–1 || align="left"| @ Carolina Hurricanes (2001–02) ||18–15–5–2 || 
|- align="center" bgcolor="#FFBBBB"
|41||L||January 7, 2002||2–3 || align="left"| Los Angeles Kings (2001–02) ||18–16–5–2 || 
|- align="center" bgcolor="#CCFFCC" 
|42||W||January 9, 2002||5–1 || align="left"| Calgary Flames (2001–02) ||19–16–5–2 || 
|- align="center" bgcolor="#FFBBBB"
|43||L||January 10, 2002||2–3 || align="left"| @ Philadelphia Flyers (2001–02) ||19–17–5–2 || 
|- align="center" bgcolor="#FFBBBB"
|44||L||January 12, 2002||1–2 || align="left"| @ Buffalo Sabres (2001–02) ||19–18–5–2 || 
|- align="center" bgcolor="#FF6F6F"
|45||OTL||January 15, 2002||4–5 OT|| align="left"| Tampa Bay Lightning (2001–02) ||19–18–5–3 || 
|- align="center" bgcolor="#CCFFCC" 
|46||W||January 17, 2002||6–4 || align="left"| New York Rangers (2001–02) ||20–18–5–3 || 
|- align="center" 
|47||T||January 19, 2002||3–3 OT|| align="left"| Carolina Hurricanes (2001–02) ||20–18–6–3 || 
|- align="center" bgcolor="#FFBBBB"
|48||L||January 21, 2002||2–3 || align="left"| @ Tampa Bay Lightning (2001–02) ||20–19–6–3 || 
|- align="center" bgcolor="#CCFFCC" 
|49||W||January 23, 2002||3–1 || align="left"| @ Florida Panthers (2001–02) ||21–19–6–3 || 
|- align="center" bgcolor="#FFBBBB"
|50||L||January 24, 2002||2–4 || align="left"| @ Atlanta Thrashers (2001–02) ||21–20–6–3 || 
|- align="center" 
|51||T||January 26, 2002||2–2 OT|| align="left"| @ Minnesota Wild (2001–02) ||21–20–7–3 || 
|- align="center" bgcolor="#CCFFCC" 
|52||W||January 29, 2002||3–1 || align="left"| @ New York Islanders (2001–02) ||22–20–7–3 || 
|- align="center" bgcolor="#CCFFCC" 
|53||W||January 30, 2002||3–1 || align="left"| Chicago Blackhawks (2001–02) ||23–20–7–3 || 
|-

|- align="center" bgcolor="#FFBBBB"
|54||L||February 5, 2002||0–1 || align="left"| Montreal Canadiens (2001–02) ||23–21–7–3 || 
|- align="center" 
|55||T||February 7, 2002||3–3 OT|| align="left"| Atlanta Thrashers (2001–02) ||23–21–8–3 || 
|- align="center" bgcolor="#CCFFCC" 
|56||W||February 9, 2002||2–1 OT|| align="left"| @ Pittsburgh Penguins (2001–02) ||24–21–8–3 || 
|- align="center" bgcolor="#CCFFCC" 
|57||W||February 10, 2002||4–1 || align="left"| Buffalo Sabres (2001–02) ||25–21–8–3 || 
|- align="center" 
|58||T||February 12, 2002||2–2 OT|| align="left"| @ Buffalo Sabres (2001–02) ||25–21–9–3 || 
|- align="center" bgcolor="#CCFFCC" 
|59||W||February 26, 2002||4–3 || align="left"| @ New York Rangers (2001–02) ||26–21–9–3 || 
|- align="center" bgcolor="#FFBBBB"
|60||L||February 27, 2002||0–1 || align="left"| Philadelphia Flyers (2001–02) ||26–22–9–3 || 
|-

|- align="center" bgcolor="#CCFFCC" 
|61||W||March 1, 2002||4–2 || align="left"| Toronto Maple Leafs (2001–02) ||27–22–9–3 || 
|- align="center" bgcolor="#FFBBBB"
|62||L||March 4, 2002||0–2 || align="left"| @ Colorado Avalanche (2001–02) ||27–23–9–3 || 
|- align="center" bgcolor="#FFBBBB"
|63||L||March 5, 2002||1–4 || align="left"| @ Phoenix Coyotes (2001–02) ||27–24–9–3 || 
|- align="center" bgcolor="#FFBBBB"
|64||L||March 8, 2002||1–2 || align="left"| @ Mighty Ducks of Anaheim (2001–02) ||27–25–9–3 || 
|- align="center" bgcolor="#CCFFCC" 
|65||W||March 10, 2002||3–0 || align="left"| @ Dallas Stars (2001–02) ||28–25–9–3 || 
|- align="center" bgcolor="#CCFFCC" 
|66||W||March 13, 2002||3–2 || align="left"| New York Islanders (2001–02) ||29–25–9–3 || 
|- align="center" bgcolor="#CCFFCC" 
|67||W||March 16, 2002||3–1 || align="left"| New York Rangers (2001–02) ||30–25–9–3 || 
|- align="center" bgcolor="#FF6F6F"
|68||OTL||March 17, 2002||2–3 OT|| align="left"| Vancouver Canucks (2001–02) ||30–25–9–4 || 
|- align="center" bgcolor="#CCFFCC" 
|69||W||March 20, 2002||3–1 || align="left"| @ Chicago Blackhawks (2001–02) ||31–25–9–4 || 
|- align="center" bgcolor="#CCFFCC" 
|70||W||March 21, 2002||4–3 || align="left"| @ Nashville Predators (2001–02) ||32–25–9–4 || 
|- align="center" bgcolor="#FFBBBB"
|71||L||March 23, 2002||2–4 || align="left"| Carolina Hurricanes (2001–02) ||32–26–9–4 || 
|- align="center" bgcolor="#CCFFCC" 
|72||W||March 25, 2002||3–1 || align="left"| Florida Panthers (2001–02) ||33–26–9–4 || 
|- align="center" bgcolor="#CCFFCC" 
|73||W||March 27, 2002||4–3 || align="left"| @ Pittsburgh Penguins (2001–02) ||34–26–9–4 || 
|- align="center" bgcolor="#FFBBBB"
|74||L||March 29, 2002||1–3 || align="left"| Washington Capitals (2001–02) ||34–27–9–4 || 
|- align="center" bgcolor="#CCFFCC" 
|75||W||March 30, 2002||3–1 || align="left"| @ Toronto Maple Leafs (2001–02) ||35–27–9–4 || 
|-

|- align="center" bgcolor="#FFBBBB"
|76||L||April 1, 2002||2–4 || align="left"| @ New York Islanders (2001–02) ||35–28–9–4 || 
|- align="center" bgcolor="#CCFFCC" 
|77||W||April 3, 2002||3–2 || align="left"| @ Carolina Hurricanes (2001–02) ||36–28–9–4 || 
|- align="center" bgcolor="#CCFFCC" 
|78||W||April 5, 2002||3–1 || align="left"| @ Atlanta Thrashers (2001–02) ||37–28–9–4 || 
|- align="center" bgcolor="#CCFFCC" 
|79||W||April 7, 2002||3–2 OT|| align="left"| Boston Bruins (2001–02) ||38–28–9–4 || 
|- align="center" bgcolor="#CCFFCC" 
|80||W||April 10, 2002||1–0 || align="left"| Philadelphia Flyers (2001–02) ||39–28–9–4 || 
|- align="center" bgcolor="#CCFFCC" 
|81||W||April 12, 2002||5–2 || align="left"| Montreal Canadiens (2001–02) ||40–28–9–4 || 
|- align="center" bgcolor="#CCFFCC" 
|82||W||April 13, 2002||4–3 OT|| align="left"| @ Washington Capitals (2001–02) ||41–28–9–4 || 
|-

|-
| Legend:

Playoffs

|- align="center" bgcolor="#FFBBBB"
| 1 ||L|| April 17, 2002 || 1–2 || align="left"| @ Carolina Hurricanes || Hurricanes lead 1–0 || 
|- align="center" bgcolor="#FFBBBB"
| 2 ||L|| April 19, 2002 || 1–2 OT || align="left"| @ Carolina Hurricanes || Hurricanes lead 2–0 || 
|- align="center" bgcolor="#CCFFCC"
| 3 ||W|| April 21, 2002 || 4–0 || align="left"| Carolina Hurricanes || Hurricanes lead 2–1 || 
|- align="center" bgcolor="#CCFFCC"
| 4 ||W|| April 23, 2002 || 3–1 || align="left"| Carolina Hurricanes || Series tied 2–2 || 
|- align="center" bgcolor="#FFBBBB"
| 5 ||L|| April 24, 2002 || 2–3 OT || align="left"| @ Carolina Hurricanes || Hurricanes lead 3–2 || 
|- align="center" bgcolor="#FFBBBB"
| 6 ||L|| April 27, 2002 || 0–1 || align="left"| Carolina Hurricanes || Hurricanes win 4–2 || 
|-

|-
| Legend:

Player statistics

Scoring
 Position abbreviations: C = Center; D = Defense; G = Goaltender; LW = Left Wing; RW = Right Wing
  = Joined team via a transaction (e.g., trade, waivers, signing) during the season. Stats reflect time with the Devils only.
  = Left team via a transaction (e.g., trade, waivers, release) during the season. Stats reflect time with the Devils only.

Goaltending
  = Joined team via a transaction (e.g., trade, waivers, signing) during the season. Stats reflect time with the Devils only.

Transactions
The Devils were involved in the following transactions from June 10, 2001, the day after the deciding game of the 2001 Stanley Cup Finals, through June 13, 2002, the day of the deciding game of the 2002 Stanley Cup Finals.

Trades

Players acquired

Players lost

Signings

Draft picks
The Devils' draft picks at the 2001 NHL Entry Draft at the National Car Rental Center in Sunrise, Florida.

See also
2001–02 NHL season

Notes

References

New Jersey Devils seasons
New Jersey Devils
New Jersey Devils
New Jersey Devils
New Jersey Devils
21st century in East Rutherford, New Jersey
Meadowlands Sports Complex